Tomás de Castro is a barrio in the municipality of Caguas, Puerto Rico. Its population in 2010 was 19,414.

History
The barrio was named after Tomás de Castro del Valenciano, a military man.

Puerto Rico was ceded by Spain in the aftermath of the Spanish–American War under the terms of the Treaty of Paris of 1898 and became an unincorporated territory of the United States. In 1899, the United States Department of War conducted a census of Puerto Rico finding that the population of Tomás de Castro barrio was 1,575.

Features and demographics

See also

 List of communities in Puerto Rico

References

Barrios of Caguas, Puerto Rico